A homeland is a territory considered by an ethnic group to be its country of origin.

Homeland may also refer to:

Arts and entertainment
 Homeland (video game), a 2005 role-playing game

Film
 Homeland (film), a 2014 Japanese drama
 Homeland: Iraq Year Zero, a 2015 documentary film

Literature
 Homeland (Doctorow novel), by Cory Doctorow, 2013
 Homeland (Forgotten Realms novel), by R. A. Salvatore, 1990
 Homeland and Other Stories, a short story collection by Barbara Kingsolver

Music
 Homeland (Laurie Anderson album), 2010
 Homeland (Miriam Makeba album), 2000
 Homeland (Neal Morse album), 2007
 The Homeland, an album by Bobby Conn and the Glass Gypsies, 2004
 Homeland, an album by Tish Hinojosa, 1989
 "Homeland" (song), by Kenny Rogers, 2001
 "Homeland", a composition by Z. Randall Stroope
 "Homeland", a song by Nolwenn Leroy, 2012

Nonfiction
 Homeland (Maharidge book), 2004 book by Dale Maharidge and photographer Michael Williamson

Television
 Homeland (TV series), an American spy thriller series
 Homeland (Chinese TV series), a 2019 military drama series
 Rodina (TV series) (Homeland), a 2015 Russian political thriller series

Places in the United States 
 Homeland, California
 Homeland, Florida
 Homeland, Georgia
 Homeland, Baltimore, Maryland
 Homeland, Missouri

Other uses
 Homeland (linguistics)
 Homeland (political alliance), a 2014 electoral alliance in Republika Srpska
 Homeland (political party), a Slovak political party
 Homeland (supermarket), an American supermarket chain
 Bantustan, or homeland, a territory for black inhabitants of South Africa and South West Africa during apartheid
 Generation Z, or the Homeland Generation, the generation following the Millennials
 Outstation (Aboriginal community), Australia, also known as a homeland

See also 
 
 Fatherland (disambiguation)
 Heimat 
 Homelands (disambiguation)
 Motherland (disambiguation)
 Outstation movement, an Indigenous Australian movement also known as homeland movement
 Patria (disambiguation)